Hazel Hall may refer to:

 Hazel Hall (poet) (1886–1924), American poet
 Hazel Hall (information scientist) (born 1963), British information scientist and academic